Balaram Sivaraman was an Indian civil servant, writer and the sixth defence secretary of India. He assumed office on the New Year's Day of 1969 and held the position until 30 November 1970. The Government of India awarded him Padma Vibhushan, the second highest Indian civilian award, in 1971.

See also

 Dharma Vira
 B. D. Pande

References

Recipients of the Padma Vibhushan in civil service
Indian civil servants
Year of birth missing
Year of death missing